Giovanni Camilla (also written Camilli or Camillo, ; fl. 2nd half of the 16th century) was an Italian physician and philosopher from Genoa.

Works

References 

16th-century Genoese people
16th-century Italian physicians
16th-century Italian philosophers